Jan Jacob Kieft (25 January 1877, Amsterdam – 2 April 1946, Rotterdam), was a Dutch gymnast who competed in the 1908 Summer Olympics. Kieft was part of the Dutch gymnastics team, which finished seventh in the team event. In the individual all-around competition he finished 74th.

References

External links
 

1877 births
1946 deaths
Dutch male artistic gymnasts
Gymnasts at the 1908 Summer Olympics
Olympic gymnasts of the Netherlands
Gymnasts from Amsterdam